Aspidioides is a monotypic genus of true bugs belonging to the family Diaspididae. The only species is Aspidioides corokiae.

References

Diaspididae
Monotypic Hemiptera genera